Fred Jinks (6 May 1909 – 16 August 1996) was an Australian cricketer. He played one first-class cricket match for Victoria in 1931.

See also
 List of Victoria first-class cricketers

References

External links
 

1909 births
1996 deaths
Australian cricketers
Victoria cricketers
Cricketers from Melbourne